Greatest Hits Encore is a 1990 studio album by American country music singer Tanya Tucker. Capitol Records' newly re-recorded versions of Tucker's hits for her former Columbia and MCA labels, which still owned the original versions.

During this time, Capitol had also signed other artists that had recorded for other labels in the past (including Ronnie Milsap and Eddie Rabbitt), and they also produced albums of re-recorded material for the label.

Track listing
"San Antonio Stroll"  (Peter Noah) – 2:55
"Delta Dawn" (Alex Harvey, Larry Collins) – 3:23
"Don't Believe My Heart Can Stand Another You"  (Billy Ray Reynolds) – 3:04
"The Jamestown Ferry" (Bobby Borchers, Mack Vickery) – 3:03
"Here's Some Love" (Richard Mainegra, Jack Roberts) – 2:53
"Would You Lay with Me (In a Field of Stone)" (David Allan Coe) – 2:49
"Blood Red and Goin' Down" (Curly Putman) – 3:13
"Pecos Promenade" (Larry Collins, Sandy Pinkard, Snuff Garrett) – 2:53
"What's Your Mama's Name" (Earl Montgomery, Dallas Frazier) – 3:13
"Texas (When I Die)" (Ed Bruce, Bobby Borchers, Patsy Bruce) – 4:01

Personnel
Tanya Tucker - lead vocals, backing vocals
Eddie Bayers - drums, backing vocals
Jessica Boucher - backing vocals
Carol Chase - backing vocals
Steve Gibson - acoustic guitar, electric guitar, hi-string guitar, mandolin, backing vocals
Greg Gordon - backing vocals
Rob Hajacos - fiddle
Byron House - Fairlight
Mitch Humphries - piano, synthesizer, backing vocals
Mike Lawler - synthesizer
Charlie McCoy - harmonica
Weldon Myrick - Dobro, steel guitar, backing vocals
Michael Rhodes - bass guitar, backing vocals
Billy Sanford - acoustic guitar, electric guitar, backing vocals
Lisa Silver - backing vocals

1990 albums
Tanya Tucker albums
Capitol Records albums
Albums produced by Jerry Crutchfield